The Bharwana or   Bhanwar   or   Bhawar   caste are a subcaste of the Sial tribe of Rajput . Those in Jhang district, Pakistan, migrated there from what is now the Indian state of Rajasthan during the 14th century, having converted to Islam under the influence of the Sufi poet Farid Ganj Shakar.

See also
Chund Bharwana
Qaim Bharwana

References

Ethnic groups in Pakistan
Rajputs
Jhang District
Rajasthan